Timuel Dixon Black Jr. (December 7, 1918 – October 13, 2021) was an American educator, civil rights activist, historian and author. A native of Alabama, Black was raised in Chicago, Illinois and studied the city's African American history. He was active in the Civil Rights movement of the 1960s, most notably participating in Dr. Martin Luther King Jr.'s Chicago Freedom Movement during 1965 and 1966. Black was part of a coalition of Black Chicagoans which worked to elect Chicago's first African–American mayor, Harold Washington in 1983, and he mentored a young Barack Obama, the future U.S. president, on building a political base on Chicago's South Side.

Biography

Early life and family
Timuel Dixon Black Jr. was born on December 7, 1918, in Birmingham, Alabama. Black's great-grandparents were slaves and his grandparents were born as slaves and freed by the Emancipation Proclamation; his parents were sharecroppers. Black described his father, Timuel Dixon Black Sr.  and mother, Mattie (née McConner) as having taken part in the Great Migration. In his memoir, Sacred Ground, Black writes that his parents "migrated twice." Their first move was "from tenant farms where they chopped cotton to the market town of Florence, Alabama, and then on from there to the city of Birmingham," where his "daddy worked for Bessemer Steel." Their second migration was to Chicago in order "to be able fight back against white attackers, to get better jobs and be able to vote, and to get a better education for their children."

Education and military service
Black grew up in Chicago's Bronzeville neighborhood. For school, Black attended Burke Elementary School, Englewood High School, Wendell Phillips Academy High School and later graduated from DuSable High School in June 1937. After high school, Black worked for Robert Cole’s Chicago Metropolitan Assurance Company; later leaving Chicago to work at Greenbaum Tannery in Milwaukee, Wisconsin. In 1952, Black graduated from Roosevelt University, where he earned a bachelor's degree, and he later earned a master's degree from the University of Chicago. Black served in World War II, and he received four Battle Stars, the Croix de Guerre, and the Legion of Honour.

Career

Black began his career as a teacher. After receiving his bachelor's degree, Black began working at Roosevelt High School in Gary, Indiana in 1954. Black relocated back to Chicago in 1957 and began teaching at his alma mater, DuSable High School until 1959. Black worked as a social worker. During the 1960s, Black was president of the Negro American Labor Council (Chicago Chapter) and an organizer of Chicago participation in the 1963 March on Washington. During the 1963 Chicago municipal elections, Black unsuccessfully challenged Claude Holman, Chicago's 4th ward aldermen who was aligned with Mayor Richard J. Daley and with Chicago Public Schools superintendent Benjamin Willis. 

In 1975, Black took a position to teach history, sociology and anthropology at Loop College, now Harold Washington College.  In 1982, he approached Harold Washington, then a congressman, to run for mayor of Chicago.  Black's organizing of support and likely voters helped convince Washington to make his successful mayoral bid.  In the 1990s, Black met with Barack Obama on building a political career on Chicago's South Side, and introduced  Obama  to people who became helpful to the career of the future U.S. president.  Black was the named plaintiff in the lawsuit Black v. McGuffage. The suit claimed that the Illinois voting system discriminated against minorities in its use of faulty punch card ballots. Deployed in black and Hispanic neighborhoods in Chicago, the faulty ballots prevented residents from casting valid votes in the 2000 presidential election. After Black v. McGuffage, punch card ballots were eliminated and a uniform voting system was put in place. Black served on the board of Defending Rights & Dissent.

Tributes and legacy
In 2017, Senator Dick Durbin introduced a tribute to Black in the Congressional Record on the occasion of Black's receipt of Citizen Action Illinois' ninth annual Pauls Award, named for Paul Simon and Paul Wellstone, describing Black as "a decorated World War II veteran, an educator, author, labor leader, civil rights activist, and historian—and a bender of the moral arc of the universe. He is a visionary and—for me and so many others—a personal hero."
Sacred Ground is a memoir of interviews with Black about the African-American history of the South side of Chicago conducted by Susan Klonsky and edited by Bart Schultz was published in 2019. Black explained, "I'm here to personalize and transfer that history to younger people across all lines--race and gender."

Personal life and death
Black married three times and had two children. From 1946 until 1958, Black was married to Norisea J. Cummings and together they had two children, Ermetra and Timuel Kerrigan Black. Black's second marriage was to Ruby P. Battle from 1959 to 1968. From 1981 until his death, Black was married to Zenobia Johnson. In October 2021, it was reported that Black was in hospice care at his Kenwood home in Chicago. Black died at his home in Chicago on October 13, 2021 from prostate cancer, at the age of 102.

Works

References

Sources

<li> "Timuel D. Black, Jr. Papers," Chicago Public Library; 
<li> "Timuel Black papers, 1956–1973," Chicago History Museum; 

1918 births
2021 deaths
Military personnel from Birmingham, Alabama
Writers from Birmingham, Alabama
Writers from Chicago
Roosevelt University alumni
University of Chicago alumni
United States Army personnel of World War II
Recipients of the Croix de Guerre 1939–1945 (France)
Recipients of the Legion of Honour
African-American centenarians
American centenarians
Men centenarians
African-American history in Chicago